Virrat is a town and municipality of Finland. The town has a population of 
which 
is water. The population density is
. The municipality is unilingually Finnish.

The town grew rapidly in the middle years of the twentieth century, and by 1950 the population reached more than 12,000. Virrat acquired town status in 1977, although it had received the right to hold markets three years earlier, in 1974. More recently the population level has been adversely impacted by the drift of employment opportunities and people to the larger towns. Apart from the town of Virrat itself, the administratively defined municipality is largely rural, and includes the villages of Äijänneva, Härkönen Jäähdyspohja, Killinkoski, Koro, Kotala, Kurjenkylä, Liedenpohja, Ohtola, Vaskuu, and Vaskivesi.

Major lakes in the area are Lake Toisvesi, beside which the town of Virrat is located, and Lake Tarjanne at the border of the municipalities of Virrat, Mänttä-Vilppula, and Ruovesi.

Virrat crater on Mars is named after it.

Notable people
 Seppo Hovinen (born 1951), a Finnish javelin thrower
 I. K. Inha (1865–1930), a Finnish photographer, author, translator, and journalist
 Antti Lieroinen (?–1643), a famous Finnish cunning man and death-sentenced for witchcraft
 Vesa Rantanen (born 1975), a Finnish pole vaulter
 Tom Sukanen (1873–1943), a Finnish-born Canadian sailor and farmer

Gallery

See also
 Finnish Lake Road

References

External links

 Town of Virrat – Official site 

 
Cities and towns in Finland
Populated places established in 1868